A one-night stand or one-night sex is a single sexual encounter in which there is an expectation that there shall be no further relations between the sexual participants. It draws its name from the common practice of a one-night stand, a single night performance by an entertainer at a venue. The practice can be described as "sexual activity without emotional commitment or future involvement".

Views 

The one-night stand is the most common form of infidelity and is often used in research, polls and surveys to define the level of promiscuity in a society at any given time. It has been suggested that such an act can be as threatening to a relationship as a long-term affair:

Some women have suggested that women who feel sexually insecure or unfulfilled should seek out one-night stands for personal growth and fulfillment. One writes, "[a] one-night stand is the erotic manifestation of carpe diem— only we are seizing the night instead of the day". Another source advises women seeking empowerment to "jumpstart your heyday by having a one-night stand", and clarifies that the one-night stand should be a conscious decision.

The prevalence of one-night stands has been abetted by the advent of online dating apps such as Tinder and Grindr, which allow people to connect for purposes including sexual encounters, although these tools can also be used to seek longer-term relationship partners.

Further relations 
Relationship therapist Laura Berman suggests that the circumstances that lead to such an encounter do not necessarily preclude a later relationship:

In contrast to a one-night stand, when the individuals involved have recurrent sexual contact without romantic involvement, this is considered a casual sexual relationship.

Fantasy
A one-night stand may also be included in a sexual fantasy.

See also 
 Anonymous sex
 Casual sex
 Cottaging
 Group sex
 Hookup culture
 Quickie (sexual act)

References

External links 

Casual sex